The Kuikuro are an indigenous people of Brazil.

Kuikuro may also refer to:

Kuikuro language
Kuikúro-Kalapálo language, or Amonap